Greenwood School or The Greenwood School may refer to:

Greenwood School (Greenwood, Arkansas), recognized by Arkansas as historic site in Greenwood, Arkansas, at least nominated if not yet listed on the National Register of Historic Places (NRHP)
Greenwood School, operated by the Hamilton County School District of Hamilton County, Florida
Greenwood School (Des Moines, Iowa), NRHP-listed in Polk County, Iowa
Greenwood School (West Whiteland, Pennsylvania), NRHP-listed
Old Greenwood High School, Greenwood, South Carolina, NRHP-listed
The Greenwood School (Putney, Vermont), a school for boys with learning disabilities, featured in the 2014 Ken Burns documentary The Address
Greenwood Elementary School, River Falls, Wisconsin
Greenwood School (Seattle), an elementary school